Arikan (also Romanized as Ārīkān) is a village in Hayaquq-e Nabi Rural District, in the Central District of Tuyserkan County, Hamadan Province, Iran. At the 2015 census, its population was 560, in 132 families.

References 

Populated places in Tuyserkan County